V. V. Rajan Chellappa is an Indian Politician and former Mayor of Madurai Corporation and also he is MLA from Thiruparankundram. As a cadre of All India Anna Dravida Munnetra Kazhagam party, he previously served as a member of Rajya Sabha. from 1992 - 1998.

Chellappa polled 1,03,683 votes defeating his nearest rival S. K. Ponnuthai of the CPI(M) who secured 74,194 votes for Thiruparankundram Legislative Assembly in April 2021.

References

External links
 Rajan Chellappa is Mayor
 Mayor Election Oct 2011

All India Anna Dravida Munnetra Kazhagam politicians
Living people
Politicians from Madurai
Tamil Nadu municipal councillors
Mayors of places in Tamil Nadu
1949 births
Tamil Nadu MLAs 2016–2021
Tamil Nadu MLAs 2021–2026
Tamil Nadu politicians